is a JR West railway station located in Shimonoseki, Yamaguchi Prefecture, Japan.

The station is served by the San'in Main Line.

Adjacent stations

External links 
Kawatanaonsen Station (JR West) 

Railway stations in Japan opened in 1914
Railway stations in Yamaguchi Prefecture
Sanin Main Line
Stations of West Japan Railway Company